Stéphane Clavier (born 14 March 1955) is a French screenwriter and film director.

Personal life
Stéphane is the brother of actor Christian Clavier.

Filmography

References

External links

1955 births
Living people
French film directors
French male screenwriters
French screenwriters
French-language film directors